Apache Ambush is a 1955 American Western film directed by Fred F. Sears and starring Bill Williams, Richard Jaeckel and Alex Montoya.

Plot
The Civil War now over,  President Lincoln, just hours before his assassination, selects Indian scout James Kingston to facilitate a cattle shipment from Texas to the north. He is helped by cattle driver Tim O’Roarke and Maj. McGuire. Mexican fanatic Joaquin Jironza, in cahoots with the Apaches, wants the Henry Repeating Rifles that Hank Calvin is shipping with Kingston’s convoy. Embittered ex-rebel leader Lee Parker is also an obstacle to Kingston's mission, as he tries to drive the cattle through Confederate and Apache territory. Calvin is killed when the convoy is attacked by Apaches. Later, the rifles are missing and Parker is suspected due to his confederate sympathies, but he denies the theft. The Union Army is unable to provide Kingston an adequate escort for the cattle drive because of orders to secure the Mexican border. Kingston discovers Parker knows where the rifles are and a fight ensues between the Southerners in town and Kingston’s men. After Parker leaves, the town and Kingston’s men unite to search for the rifles to prevent Jironza from finding them. Parker is captured by Jironza. Parker offers to tell Jironza where the rifles are in exchange for the protection of his father and sister, Ann; and, for assistance in disrupting the cattle drive. Kingston finds the rifles buried under Calvin’s wagon, and is attacked by Jironza. Jironza mortally wounds Parker and kills his father. Before Parker dies, he tells Ann to let Kingston know about an Apache ambush Jironza has planned. The Apaches stampede the cattle and a gunfight ensues. The Apache chief is killed and the other Indians retreat. Kingston and his men continue the drive to Abilene. Kingston promises Ann he will return.

Cast
 Bill Williams as James Kingston  
 Richard Jaeckel as Lee Parker
 Alex Montoya as Joaquin Jironza
 Movita as Rosita
 Adelle August as Ann Parker
 Tex Ritter as Traegar
 Ray Corrigan as Hank Calvin (as Ray 'Crash' Corrigan)
 Ray Teal – Sergeant Tim O'Roarke
 Don Harvey as Donald Tex McGuire (as Don G. Harvey)
 James Griffith as President Abraham Lincoln
 James Flavin as Colonel Marshall
 George Chandler as Chandler
 Forrest Lewis as Sheriff Silas Parker
 George Keymas as Tweedy
 Chris Alcaide as Lt. Shaffin (uncredited)

See also
 List of American films of 1955

External links
 

1955 films
1955 Western (genre) films
American Civil War films
American Western (genre) films
American black-and-white films
Columbia Pictures films
Films directed by Fred F. Sears
Films set in Texas
1950s English-language films
1950s American films